Tampea hammatocera is a moth of the subfamily Arctiinae first described by Wileman and West in 1928. It is found on Luzon in the Philippines.

References

Lithosiini